Charles Ruley "Tod" Brynan (July 1863 – May 10, 1925) was a right-handed pitcher/outfielder in Major League Baseball for the Chicago White Stockings (later the Cubs) and Boston Beaneaters (now the Atlanta Braves).

Brynan debuted with the White Stockings on June 22, 1888, against the Pittsburgh Alleghenys. He pitched in three games that season, completing two, on his way to posting a record of 2–1 with an inflated 6.48 ERA. He also made one appearance in left field during his tenure with the Stockings. At the plate that season, he hit .182 with a triple and an RBI in 11 trips to the plate.

Brynan would not resurface until May 26, 1891, pitching for the Beaneaters. He started that game on the mound but did not last long, getting pulled after a disastrous first inning in which he allowed six earned runs on four hits and three walks for an unfortunate ERA of 54.00.

He also played in the minors in the Southern Association in 1886, Northwestern League in 1887, Western Association from 1888 to 1889 and Michigan State League in 1889.

References

1863 births
1925 deaths
Baseball players from Pennsylvania
Chicago White Stockings players
Boston Beaneaters players
Major League Baseball pitchers
Major League Baseball outfielders
Nashville Americans players
Memphis Grays players
Duluth Freezers players
Minneapolis Millers (baseball) players
St. Paul Apostles players
Des Moines Prohibitionists players
Milwaukee Brewers (minor league) players
Milwaukee Creams players
Grand Rapids (minor league baseball) players
19th-century baseball players